The Roland E. Powell Convention Center, also known as the Ocean City Convention Center, is a multi-purpose convention center in Ocean City, Maryland, USA.  It contains  of floor space. It can also be converted into a 5,000 seat indoor arena that can host sporting events, like wrestling, as well as concerts.  It is named after former mayor of Ocean City, Roland E. Powell.
Food and beverage, catering, and special event services are provided by Centerplate.

External links
  Roland E. Powell Convention Center

References

Sports venues in Maryland
Indoor arenas in Maryland
Convention centers in Maryland
Ocean City, Maryland
1997 establishments in Maryland
Event venues established in 1997
Sports venues completed in 1997